Ulocymus is a genus of spiders in the family Thomisidae. It was first described in 1886 by Simon. , it contains 4 species from Brazil and Argentina.

References

Thomisidae
Araneomorphae genera
Spiders of South America